Pseudocalamobius montanus is a species of beetle in the family Cerambycidae. It was described by Hayashi in 1959.

References

Agapanthiini
Beetles described in 1959